Rudbeckia subtomentosa, the sweet coneflower, is a flowering plant in the family Asteraceae and is found in the central United States.

References

subtomentosa